The Fatal Woman is a 1915 Dutch silent drama film directed by  Maurits Binger and Louis H. Chrispijn.

De vloek van het testament can be translated as The curse of the testimony; the film was a big Dutch movie at the time with 48 copies through Europe and 12 copies crossing to America. It was the last directed movie of Chrispijn; he wanted to get out of movies.

The storyline is about a testimony found in an old wooden desk and advocate couple van Dalen claiming the rights of it. After a big manhunt (everybody wants the testimony), it comes back to the finder and rightful owner.

Cast
Annie Bos	... 	Annie van Dalen
Willem van der Veer	... 	Willem van Dalen
Jan van Dommelen	... 	Jan Velsen, Cabinetmaker
Coen Hissink		
Nelly De Heer		
Fred Homann

External links 
 

1915 films
Dutch silent feature films
Dutch black-and-white films
1915 drama films
Films directed by Maurits Binger
Films directed by Louis H. Chrispijn
Dutch drama films
Silent drama films